Follow Me! is a series of television programmes produced by Bayerischer Rundfunk and the BBC in the late 1970s to provide a crash course in the English language. It became popular in many overseas countries as a first introduction to English; in 1983, one hundred million people watched the show in China alone, featuring Kathy Flower.

Follow Me! was also shown regularly on SBS Television in Australia between 1981 and 1985 in tandem with another English tuition program, People You Meet.

The British actor Francis Matthews hosted and narrated the series.

The course consists of sixty lessons. Each lesson lasts from 12 to 15 minutes and covers a specific lexis. The lessons follow a consistent group of actors, with the relationships between their characters developing during the course.

Follow Me! actors
 Francis Matthews
 Raymond Mason
 David Savile
 Ian Bamforth
 Keith Alexander
 Diane Mercer
 Jane Argyle
 Diana King
 Veronica Leigh
 Elaine Wells

Episodes 
 "What's your name"
 "How are you"
 "Can you help me"
 "Left, right, straight ahead"
 "Where are they"
 "What's the time"
 "What's this What's that"
 "I like it very much"
 "Have you got any wine"
 "What are they doing"
 "Can I have your name, please"
 "What does she look like"
 "No smoking"
 "It's on the first floor"
 "Where's he gone"
 "Going away"
 "Buying things"
 "Why do you like it"
 "What do you need"
 "I sometimes work late"
 "Welcome to Britain"
 "Who's that"
 "What would you like to do"
 "How can I get there?"
 "Where is it"
 "What's the date"
 "Whose is it"
 "I enjoy it"
 "How many and how much"
 "What have you done"
 "Haven't we met before"
 "What did you say"
 "Please stop"
 "How can I get to Brightly"
 "Where can I get it"
 "There's a concert on Wednesday"
 "What's it like"
 "What do you think of him"
 "I need someone"
 "What were you doing"
 "What do you do"
 "What do you know about him"
 "You shouldn't do that"
 "I hope you enjoy your holiday"
 "Where can I see a football match"
 "When will it be ready"
 "Where did you go"
 "I think it's awful"
 "A room with a view"
 "You'll be ill"
 "I don't believe in strikes"
 "They look tired"
 "Would you like to"
 "Holiday plans"
 "The second shelf on the left"
 "When you are ready"
 "Tell them about Britain"
 "I liked everything"
 "Classical or modern"
 "Finale"

References 

 BBC article about the series in China

External links 
 Follow Me – Beginner level 
 Follow Me – Elementary level
 Follow Me – Intermediate level
 Follow Me – Advanced level

Adult education television series
English-language education television programming
1970s British television series
1970s German television series
Bayerischer Rundfunk